Kep is the capital of Kep Province in southern Cambodia. It lies near Kep National Park. The town has a population of 35,990.

Gallery

References

Towns in Cambodia
Populated places in Kep province